Kathy Ellen Manning (born December 3, 1956) is an American lawyer and politician from North Carolina. She is the U.S. representative from North Carolina's 6th congressional district. The district is in the heart of the Piedmont Triad and includes Greensboro and most of Winston-Salem. She was the nominee for North Carolina's 13th congressional district in the 2018 election, and ran for and won the neighboring 6th in the 2020 election after court-ordered redistricting.

Early life and education
Manning was born to a Jewish family in Detroit, Michigan, on December 3, 1956. Her father worked for the Ford Motor Company for 40 years, and her mother was a public school teacher. Manning attended Harvard University, where she sang a cappella with the Radcliffe Pitches. She also attended the University of Michigan Law School, earning a Juris Doctor.

Early career 
After graduating from college, Manning moved to Greensboro, her husband's hometown, in 1987. She was the first woman to serve as board chair of the Jewish Federations of North America, from 2009 to 2012. She also was the founding board chair of Prizmah: Center for Jewish Day Schools in New York.

U.S. House of Representatives

Elections

2018 

At the time, the district stretched from southwestern Greensboro to the northern exurbs of Charlotte. On paper, the district tilted Republican; Donald Trump had carried the district two years earlier with 53% of the vote. She lost to Budd, 51%–45%.

2020 

After a court-ordered redistricting in 2019, Manning's home in Greensboro was drawn into the neighboring , represented by three-term Republican Mark Walker. The new 6th included all of Guilford County and swept west to grab the more Democratic areas of neighboring Forsyth County, including almost all of Winston-Salem. The old 6th included eastern Greensboro, as well as much of the eastern Triad and some outer suburbs of the Triangle.

On December 2, 2019, hours before the new map was issued, Manning announced she would run in the 6th. The new district was significantly more compact and Democratic than its predecessor. Had it existed in 2016, Hillary Clinton would have won it with over 59% of the vote–a near-mirror image of Trump's 56% in the old 6th. On paper, the new 6th was one of the most Democratic white-majority districts in the South.

With most observers believing the 6th was a likely Democratic pickup, Walker announced he would not run for a fourth term.

Manning won the Democratic primary, and in the general election, she defeated Republican nominee Lee Haywood with 62% of the vote. Upon her swearing-in on January 3, 2021, she became the first Democrat to represent this district since 1985, and the first white Democrat to represent a Triad-based district since Steve Neal left office in 1995.

Manning has stated health care is one of her driving issues, motivated by the "labyrinthine process of getting insurance" to cover her daughter's medication.

Tenure

Committee assignments 
Committee on Foreign Affairs
Subcommittee on Asia, the Pacific, Central Asia and Nonproliferation
Subcommittee on the Middle East, North Africa and Global Counterterrorism
Committee on Education and Labor
Subcommittee on Early Childhood, Elementary and Secondary Education
Subcommittee on Higher Education and Workforce Investment

Caucus memberships 
New Democrat Coalition
 Bipartisan Historically Black Colleges and Universities Caucus
 Labor Caucus
 Democratic Women's Working Group
 Black Maternal Health Caucus
 Women's Caucus
 Pro-Choice Caucus
 Equality Caucus

Personal life
Manning and her husband, Randall Kaplan, have three children.

Electoral history

See also
List of Jewish members of the United States Congress
Women in the United States House of Representatives

References

External links

 Representative Kathy Manning official U.S. House website
 Campaign website

|-

}

1956 births
Living people
21st-century American women politicians
Candidates in the 2018 United States elections
Democratic Party members of the United States House of Representatives from North Carolina
Female members of the United States House of Representatives
Harvard College alumni
Jewish American attorneys
Jewish members of the United States House of Representatives
North Carolina lawyers
People from Greensboro, North Carolina
Politicians from Detroit
University of Michigan Law School alumni
Women in North Carolina politics
21st-century American politicians
American Jews from North Carolina